Woyram Boakye-Danquah is an Administrator and the former District Chief Executive of the South Dayi District in the Volta Region of Ghana.

Boachie-Danquah worked in various administrative roles prior to engaging in politics. She was nominated by President John Kufuor in 2005 for the position of District Chief Executive of the newly created South Dayi District. She remained in this position until the Kufuor government was replaced following the Ghanaian presidential election in December 2008. She was subsequently replaced with Kafui Bekui, a fish scientist, in 2009 by President Mills.

References

See also 
 South Dayi District

Living people
Year of birth missing (living people)
New Patriotic Party politicians
21st-century Ghanaian women politicians
University of Ghana alumni